Arthur Harry Pangman (June 1, 1905 in Montreal – June 25, 1996 in Montreal) was a Canadian cross-country skier who competed in the 1932 Winter Olympics.

In 1932 he finished 35th in the shorter cross-country skiing competition.

References

External links
 Arthur Pangman
 Cross-country skiing 1932 
 profile

1905 births
Year of death missing
Canadian male cross-country skiers
Olympic cross-country skiers of Canada
Cross-country skiers at the 1932 Winter Olympics